Rainbow was a galleon of the English Tudor navy, built at Deptford Dockyard by Peter Pett (the first of that name in this extensive family), and launched in 1586. Commanded by Lord Henry Seymour, a younger son of Edward Seymour, 1st Duke of Somerset by his second wife Anne Stanhope, she fought against the Spanish during the Singeing the King of Spain's Beard and the Spanish Armada, including the Battle of Gravelines in 1588.

In 1617 Rainbow was rebuilt at Deptford as a great ship (now described as a "second rate"), mounting 34 major and 6 smaller guns. She was again reconstructed in 1628–29 at Chatham, although the work was classed as a "repair" rather than as an official rebuilding. By 1660 her armament had increased to 56 guns.

She took an active role in all three Anglo-Dutch Wars of the 17th century, participating in most of the battles of those wars, and was sunk as a breakwater at Sheerness in 1680.

Notes

References
Citations

Bibliography

Lavery, Brian (2003) The Ship of the Line - Volume 1: The development of the battlefleet 1650-1850. Conway Maritime Press. .
Winfield, Rif (2009) British Warships in the Age of Sail, 1603-1714: Design, Construction, Careers and Fates. Seaforth Publishing. .

Galleons of the Royal Navy
Ships of the English navy
16th-century ships
Ships built in Deptford
Ships sunk as breakwaters